Carlos Pedro Zilli (7 October 1954 – 31 March 2021) was a Brazilian-born Bissau-Guinean Roman Catholic bishop. He became the Roman Catholic bishop of the newly created Diocese of Bafatá in Guinea-Bissau in 2001.

Biography
Zilli was born in Santa Cruz do Rio Pardo, São Paulo State. He became a member of the Pontifical Institute for Foreign Missions (P.I.M.E.) on 6 July 1984. He was ordained a Roman Catholic priest on 5 January 1985. He was sent shortly after to Guinea-Bissau, where he was parochial vicar at Bafatá mission. He was also deputy of the bishop for the Cacheu zone. He held office as president of the commission for the formation of the major seminarians, from 1986 to 1998, and regional superior of the Pontifical Institute for Foreign Missions in Guinea-Bissau, from 1993 to 1997.

On 13 March 2001, Zilli was appointed the first bishop of the Diocese of Bafatá when it was created from the Diocese of Bissau. He was ordained on 30 June 2001.

Zilli died in Prabis on 31 March 2021, from COVID-19. He was 66 years old.

References

External links
Diocese of Bafatá, Guinea-Bissau

1954 births
2021 deaths
21st-century Roman Catholic bishops in Guinea-Bissau
People from São Paulo (state)
Brazilian emigrants to Guinea-Bissau
Deaths from the COVID-19 pandemic in Guinea-Bissau
Roman Catholic bishops of Bafatá